Poppel may refer to:

 Poppel (pig), French name of the Belgian Landrace
 Poppel (village), a village in the Belgian municipality of Ravels
 Ernst Pöppel, German psychologist and neuroscientist

See also
 Van Poppel
 Popple (disambiguation)